Gerry Collins is the name of:
 Gerry Collins (politician) (born 1938), former Irish Fianna Fáil politician from Limerick and senior government minister
 Gerry Collins (broadcaster), Australian sports broadcaster
 Gerry Collins (footballer) (born 1955), Scottish footballer and coach
Gerard Collins (artist), (born 1957) Canadian painter
 Gerard Collins (canoeist) (born 1952), Irish slalom canoer

See also
 Jerry Collins (1980–2015), New Zealand rugby player